Unrest in Gostivar and Tetovo<ref>Macedonia: Police Violence in Macedonia Human Rights Watch, April 1998. Retrieved 13 May 2015</ref> took place on July 9, 1997, in Macedonia.

 Background 
A new law on local elections was issued in 1996. The Democratic Party of Albanians won candidates in several municipalities in the western of the country. The mayor of Gostivar, Rufi Osmani, and mayor of Tetovo, Alajdin Demiri, displayed the Albanian national flag on municipality buildings despite that it was forbidden according to the Constitution. This led to controversy, and debate in the Macedonian public over whether the government should intervene and take down the Albanian flags. Since June there had been a debate in the parliament about the use of the Albanian flag, some MPs supporting that it be allowed to be hoisted on public holidays and other festivities. The announcement of Macedonian parties that they would take down the flags caused a heated atmosphere in the Albanian community. Prime Minister Branko Crvenkovski decided to conduct a police operation to remove the flags.

 Unrest 

Police raids in Gostivar started at late night, 8 July, when firstly the electricity was turned off, and then the police raided several night bars. The next day, at approximately noon, several thousand people held protests on the Gostivar Square, waving Albanian flags. Mayor Rufi Osmani spoke before the crowd, which chanted various slogans, including "Albania, Albania." The reason for this protest, it was said, was the decision of the Constitutional Court against the use of the Albanian flag in public places in Macedonia. At 15:00, special police units arrived at the municipal building in Gostivar and began removing the flags. Suddenly, there was automatic gunfire throughout the town, forcing the police to respond; four Albanians were killed and mass arrests and chases ensued, leading to chaos. Following the arrests and raids on several houses at the end of the day, the Albanian flag had been taken down, while the Macedonian one had been destroyed by the crowd. The mayors of Gostivar and Tetovo were arrested, and the following days a curfew was in effect in the cities.

On 10 July violent demonstrations continued, with gunfire from both ethnic parts in Gostivar, which resulted in the wounding of 70 people, including three policemen. In July, the two main Albanian parties, Party for Democratic Prosperity and National Democratic Party, held a joint assembly in Tetovo, to reinforce the Albanian request. The assembly decided that the Albanians establish their own paramilitary police in black uniforms reminiscent of the Albanian Fascist Militia in World War II.

 Aftermath 
Both mayors, Rufi Osmani and Alajdin Demiri, were sentenced to 13 years in prison for crime against the Constitution. They were later pardoned under the coalition government of VMRO-DPMNE and DPA. Osmani filed a lawsuit against the state at the European Court of Human Rights, which was rejected.

Macedonians interpreted this as a function of state law while Albanians have used it as an argument that the government violates their human rights, and that they are oppressed and discriminated against.

See also
 1996-1997 Macedonian protests
 2018 Macedonian protests

References

External links
 Youtube video of the unrest Retrieved 13.05.2015 Youtube video of the unrest (2) Retrieved 13.05.2015''

1997 in the Republic of Macedonia
Tetovo Municipality
Gostivar Municipality
Conflicts in 1997
Albanian separatism
1997 controversies
1997 in politics